Thinkal kalamaan was a 2020 Indian Malayalam-language television soap opera that aired on Surya TV. The series stars Haritha G Nair, Krishna and Rayjan Rajan. The show is produced by Lime Tree Productions and directed by Shiju Aroor. The show is loosely based on Hindi soap opera Kundali Bhagya.

Synopsis
The series portrays the story of a young girl, Keerthi, who finds herself slowly getting involved in a love triangle, which brings unexpected twists and turns in her life.

Plot
Keerthi is the daughter of K.K. Nair and Saraswathi. K. K. Nair left her daughter and wife as he had an extra-marital affair with another girl, Sudha. After the birth of Kalyani, the half-sister of Keerthi, Sudha began to hate Keerthi. Nair left the house along with Keerthi.

Years later
Now Keerthi is a beautiful young women, who was a passionate dancer and a nurse, unaware of the past, she thinks that her mother is dead. Keerthi is engaged but calls off her wedding as the bridegroom misbehaves with her. Kalakshetra is facing a huge crisis and will be confiscated soon. Nair leaves the house leaving Keerthi alone. She meets a kind-hearted person, Roshan. Roshan takes Keerthi to Saraswathi's house to be a paying guest, no one aware of Keerthi being Saraswathi's daughter. Keerthi becomes a physiotherapist to Roshan's grandfather. Rahul, Roshan's brother shares a conflicting relation with Keerthi while Roshan shares a cordial relation with her and slowly starts developing one sided feelings for her. Rahul and Roshan's aunt Anupama develops a major dislike for her. Roshan is not convinced with the idea of marriage. When Keerthi convinces Roshan, he agrees to marry Anjali in an apparent misunderstanding, assuming it to be Keerthi. Anjali realises his affections for Keerthi and vows to get Keerthi out of her life. Rahul also starts to fall for Keerthi. Nair is found unconscious in the city bus stop and is taken to hospital where he encounters Kalyani. When Roshan learns of Rahul's love for Keerthi, he decided to marry Anjali, actually Anjali was a fraud and she was trying to kill Roshan and steals his property. Rahul and Keerthi discover her infidelity, also Anjali was carrying her boyfriend Prem's child. Rahul and Keerthi get closer while trying to revel Anjali was a fraud and she is cheating Roshan. Eventually Roshan learns about her cheating and she was thrown out of the house and arrested by the police for trying to kill Roshan. Everyone teased Anupama for making Roshan marry Anjali, then Anupama make a shocking revelation that Roshan is her son, she gave birth to Roshan. Accidentally Roshan heard this and he was heart broken. After that Everyone force Roshan to remarry Keerthi and asked Rahul that Keerthi and Rahul was in love. To hide his love from the family, he said he is not in love with her without knowing about the wedding plan of Roshan. After knowing about this Rahul was heart broken. Roshan ask Rahul for a help to ask Keerthi for her hand in marriage. Rahul meet Keerthi for his brother, but before telling about Roshan's wish to marry her, both of them revel their feelings and hug each other. Accidentally Roshan's friend Devika see them hugging each other. From Devika Roshan learns about this and plans to kill Rahul for Keerthi. Roshan endangers Rahul and left him paralyzed. Roshan's marriage proposal make Keerthi's mother Saraswathy disgusting and she told that Keerthi will not be tied with a second knot. Because of insulting Roshan, Anupama expelled Keerthi from the house and she was unable to see Rahul and take care of him. With the help of Roshan she get into the house by lying she was engaged to Roshan, actually Roshan was cheating Keerthi by saying to family that they love each other. Saraswathy changed her mind and asked Keerthi to marry Roshan. Because of this situation Keerthi tied nuptial thread around her neck with Rahul's hand, which means now she is Rahul's wife. At that time Rahul regain consciousness, but he misunderstand Keerthi seeing her the nuptial thread, it was tied by Roshan and now Keerthi is Roshan's wife. After a lot of events Rahul understand her love towards him and Keerthi prove to Rahul and Family that Roshan tried to kill Rahul. Roshan tried to kill himself out of guilt, but was saved by Rahul and keerthi. Keerthi get an opportunity to perform dance in Trivandrum, while going to Trivandrum they accidentally meet a little girl Chinnu, her dad Bharath was in a Critical health condition and her mother and father was divorced and she was in the custody of her father Bharath, at any time we will die. Keerthi and Rahul feel sympathy for Chinnu, they console her and leave. At this time Roshan is in hospital, he was receiving counselling. In hospital Roshan meet Swapna and fell in love with her, but she was also in Anjali's gang to steal his property. Without knowing this Roshan loved her deeply. The Family decided to get marry Roshan and Rahul together at register office. Rahul and Keerthi meet the Doctor who treated Chinnu's father Bharath at register office on the day of the wedding. The Doctor revel a shocking truth to Rahul and Keerthi, that Chinnu's mother is Swapna and urgently they have to stop the wedding, unfortunately before they come Roshan tie the knot on Swapna. Sadly Rahul and Keerthi tie the knot.keerthi and Rahul brings Chinnu home by telling that Keerthi's relative in Chennai died and Chinnu is her relatives daughter and she don't have any other relative than Keerthi. Anupama and Swapna doubts whether it is Keerthi's child. Anupama tried to find the truth from Chinnu later Anupama kidnaps Chinnu so that Rahul and Keerthi will complaint police and police will ask the parents of chinnu so they can find the truth. Chinnu calls Rahul using her phone and Rahul rescue Chinnu. By this time police asked Keerthi about parents of chinnu as Anupama told she has doubt whether it is Keerthi's child. to save Roshan swapna life she lies that it is her child and everyone hated her Later Roshan understands he won't get child so he adobts Chinnu and Chinnu gets to know that swapna is her real mother. One day when swapna and Chinnu was talking Roshan overhears them and understands that Chinnu is swapna s child and she was married 1st Shocked Roshan feels betrayed. But due to anupama's talk roshan keeps swapna. Later Roshan gets his half sister and Swapna tricked Roshan and gets his money. Roshan gets angry and he cannot pay money. Later Rahul gets selected in Indian team again and Keerthi gets admitted in hospital. as match postponed to nxt day as got information that someone kept their bomb Rahul comes to hospital and knows that Keerthi Gave birth to a baby boy and finally everyone becomes happy and got a happy ending of RK story

Cast

Main
Haritha G Nair as Keerthi Rahul
A classical dancer and physiotherapist. She is the daughter of K.K Nair and Saraswathi's; Rahul's girlfriend-turned-wife.                                                                     
Krishna as Roshan Raveendran 
Swapna's husband and Anjali's ex-husband. Rahul's half-brother and Raveendran and Kalavathy's stepson; Anupama's biological son
Rayjan Rajan as Rahul Raveendran 
A footballer, Roshan's half-brother and Raveendran and Kalavathy's son; Keerthi's boyfriend-turned-husband

Recurring cast
Illekettu Namboothiri as Suvarnanpilla 
Roshan and Rahul's grandfather, Raveendran and Anupama's father, Kalawathi's father-in-law
Shalu Menon as Anupama
A dancer, Roshan's mother and Rahul's aunt
Sindhu Varma as Saraswathy
Keerthi's mother, K.K. Nair's ex-wife
Bindu Ramakrishnan as Yashoda
Saraswathi's mother, Keerthi's grandmother.
Rajani Murali as Kalawathi
Roshan's stepmother and Rahul's mother, Raveendran's wife
Manoj Kumar as Raveendran
Roshan stepfather and Rahul's father, Kalawathi's husband
Aiswarya Devi (Episode 5 - 26) /Anjali Hari as Kalyani (Episode 27 - present)
K.K.Nair and Sudha's daughter, Keerthi's half-sister.
Balachandran Chullikkadu as K.K. Nair
Keerthi and Kalyani's father, Saraswathi's ex-husband, Sudha's ex-husband.
Amrutha S Ganesh as Anjali
Roshan's ex-wife
Sarath Swamy as Prem (Episode 63 - present)
Anjali's lover 
Shilpa Martin as Devika, Roshan's friend
Dileep Sankar as Arunghosh
Alis Christy as Swapna Roshan's wife
Santhosh Pandit as Vivek, Keerthi's proposal
Ameya Nair as Sub Inspector
Sruthy Surendran (Manve) as Sunanda
Disney James as Madhu
Manoj as Roshan's father
Vinaya Prasad as Kalamandalam Umadevi
Stelna as Sudha
K.K.Nair's second wife.
Haritha Nair as Malavika
Reshma R Nair as Priya

References

Surya TV original programming
Malayalam-language television shows